Pawina Thongsuk (born April 18, 1979 in Sikhoraphum, Surin) is a Thai weightlifter. At the 2004 Summer Olympics in Athens, she won an Olympic gold medal with 122.5 kg snatching and 272.5 kg total in the 75 kg category. In 2005, she won the World Championship in the 63 kg category.

In the 2006 Asian Games in Doha she won the gold, as well as setting a new world record for the 63 kg female weight class with a clean and jerk of 142 kg.

Weightlifting career - personal best lifts

 Clean and Jerk: 155.0 kg
 Snatch: 122.5 kg
 Total: 272.5 kg
 Olympic (full) Front Squat: 190.0 kg approx.
 (Full) Back Squat: 222.5 kg approx.

Notes and references

1979 births
Living people
Pawina Thongsuk
Pawina Thongsuk
Weightlifters at the 2000 Summer Olympics
Weightlifters at the 2004 Summer Olympics
Pawina Thongsuk
World record setters in weightlifting
Olympic medalists in weightlifting
Asian Games medalists in weightlifting
Weightlifters at the 1998 Asian Games
Weightlifters at the 2002 Asian Games
Weightlifters at the 2006 Asian Games
Pawina Thongsuk
Medalists at the 2004 Summer Olympics
Pawina Thongsuk
Pawina Thongsuk
Medalists at the 2002 Asian Games
Medalists at the 2006 Asian Games
Pawina Thongsuk
Pawina Thongsuk
Southeast Asian Games medalists in weightlifting
Pawina Thongsuk
Pawina Thongsuk
Competitors at the 2001 Southeast Asian Games
World Weightlifting Championships medalists
Pawina Thongsuk
Pawina Thongsuk